First Congregational Church is a historic Congregational church located in Mount Pleasant, Cabarrus County, North Carolina. It was built between 1918 and 1921, and consists of a
one-story side gable nave; a two-stage tower; a small, gabled-roof wing that is commonly referred to as the "serving room;" and two concrete additions.  The church features stone sheathing and Gothic Revival style design details.  The church served the African-American community of Mount Pleasant.

It was listed on the National Register of Historic Places in 1986.

References

African-American history of North Carolina
Congregational churches in North Carolina
Churches on the National Register of Historic Places in North Carolina
Gothic Revival church buildings in North Carolina
Churches completed in 1918
Churches in Cabarrus County, North Carolina
National Register of Historic Places in Cabarrus County, North Carolina